Kenneth Van Compernolle (born 30 March 1988) is a Belgian professional cyclo-cross cyclist.

Major results

2004–2005
 1st Silvestercyclocross Juniors
2005–2006
 2nd National Junior Championships
 Junior Superprestige
3rd Vorselaar
3rd Hamme-Zogge
 3rd Vlaamse Duinencross Juniors
2008–2009
 UCI Under-23 World Cup
1st Koksijde
2nd Pijnacker
 Under-23 Superprestige
1st Gieten
2nd Vorselaar
2nd Hamme-Zogge
3rd Gavere
 Under-23 GvA Trophy
1st Jaarmarktcross Niel
2nd Zonhoven
3rd Sluitingsprijs Oostmalle
 2nd Kasteelcross Zonnebeke
 2nd Grand Prix van Hasselt Under-23
 3rd  European Under-23 Championships
 3rd National Under-23 Championships
 3rd Grand Prix Rouwmoer Under-23
2009–2010
 Under-23 Superprestige
2nd Zonhoven
3rd Gieten
 Under-23 GvA Trophy
3rd Sluitingsprijs Oostmalle
2010–2011
 National Trophy Series
1st Rutland
2011–2012
 2nd Uster
 3rd Lanarvily

References

External links

1988 births
Living people
Belgian male cyclists
Cyclo-cross cyclists
People from Beernem
Sportspeople from West Flanders